The Catalan Media Corporation is the public radio and television company in Catalonia owned by Generalitat de Catalunya.

The CCRTV is a public corporation created by the Generalitat de Catalunya by a Founding Act that passed the Parliament of Catalonia on May 18, 1983. It answers to the Parliamentary Control Commission and to the Catalan Audiovisual Council. It is funded through the Generalitat's General Budget as well as by income and yield from CCRTV's own activities. Its subsidiaries can partly finance themselves through advertising, sponsorship and the sale of merchandise and programming.

Catalunya Ràdio started broadcasting on June 20, 1983, while its first television channel, TV3, started its trial broadcast on September 11 of the same year.

In September 2006, CCRTV received the EFQM Excellence Award for its organisational gestion.

Budget

The current allocation from the Catalan government to the public broadcaster is 343 million euro for 2015 which is similar in size and operation to Irish public broadcaster RTÉ and Finnish broadcaster YLE.

Companies of the corporation
The CCRTV is composed of the following companies:

Televisió de Catalunya

Televisió de Catalunya is Catalonia's public broadcasting network, composed of six channels, with TV3 as its flagship channel. TVC is headquartered in Sant Joan Despí, near Barcelona.

Catalunya Radio SGR

Catalunya Radio SGR (Catalunya Ràdio) is Catalonia's public radio network. It has four stations, the most important of is its namesake Catalunya Ràdio. Catalunya Ràdio is headquartered in Barcelona.

CCRTV interactiva
CCRTV interactiva creates and distributes interactive media content for the other companies of the corporation.

Activa Multimèdia Digital
The trademark that markets CCRTV technology.

CCRTV Administració Sistemes d'Informació
Provides support for management, planning, development, systems and computing.

Corporate Shareholdings
 Catalan News Agency (Agència Catalana de Notícies) - Major shareholder.
 Vang 3 Publication - A publishing company founded by CCRTV and La Vanguardia.

The TV3 Marathon Foundation
Created by the CCRTV to manage the funds raised by the annual telethon La Marató de TV3, devoted to raise funds for scientific research into diseases that are currently incurable.

References

External links
  

 
Catalan-language radio stations
Catalan-language television networks
FORTA
Spanish radio networks
Television networks in Spain
Publicly funded broadcasters
State media
Radio stations established in 1983
Television channels and stations established in 1983
Mass media companies established in 1983
1983 establishments in Spain